Rita Gertrudis Bosaho Gori (born 21 May 1965) is an Equatorial Guinean-Spanish politician and activist member of Podemos, serving as Director-General for Equality of Treatment and Ethnic-racial Diversity in the Spanish Ministry of Equality since 2020. She was a member of the 11th and 12th terms of the Congress of Deputies.

Biography 
Bosaho on 21 May 1965 in Santa Isabel (Malabo), in the province of Fernando Poo, Spanish Guinea.

Bosaho moved to Spain at the age of 4, living with military foster families in Cádiz and Cartagena before moving to Alicante.

She holds a degree in history from the University of Alicante. She worked as a nurse for 23 years in Alicante's general hospital. She earned a Master in Identities and Integration in Contemporary Europe and is preparing a PhD dissertation on the impact of European colonization in Africa. She has also undertook activist work in the field of human rights, focusing, in particular, on reducing violence against women.

A member of Podemos, Bosaho stood as candidate in the party list vis-à-vis the May 2015 Valencian regional elections, failing to win a seat. In November 2015, Bosaho was selected as the lead candidate on the party list to the Congress of Deputies in Alicante for the December 2015 general election, a decision which was disputed by opponents within the local branch. As she earned a seat, she became Spain's first-ever black member of the Lower House.  She renovated her seat at the 2016 general election.

In January 2020, following the formation of the Sánchez II Government, Bosaho was appointed as Director-General for Equality of Treatment and Ethnic-racial Diversity of the Ministry of Equality led by Irene Montero. She assumed the post on 31 January.

References

1965 births
21st-century Spanish women politicians
Bubi people
Equatoguinean emigrants to Spain
Equatoguinean politicians
Living people
Members of the 11th Congress of Deputies (Spain)
Members of the 12th Congress of Deputies (Spain)
People from Malabo
Podemos (Spanish political party) politicians
Spanish activists
Spanish people of Bubi descent
Spanish women activists
University of Alicante alumni
Women members of the Congress of Deputies (Spain)